Dioscoreaceae is a family of monocotyledonous flowering plants, with about 715 known species in nine genera. The best-known member of the family is the yam (some species of Dioscorea).

The APG system (1998) and APG II system (2003) both place it in the order Dioscoreales, in the clade monocots. However, the circumscription changed in the APG II system, with the 2003 system expanded to include the plants that in the 1998 system were treated in the families Taccaceae and Trichopodaceae.

Taxonomy
The Dioscoreaceae were first described by Brown in 1810 as Dioscoreae, and alternatively referred to as Dioscorinae.

Subdivision
The circumscription of Dioscoreaceae has expanded over the years. For instance when Stenomeridaceae, as Stenomeris was also included in Dioscoreaceae as subfamily Stenomeridoideae together with Avetra, the remaining four genera were grouped in subfamily Dioscoreoideae, the two being distinguished by the presence of bisexual and unisexual flowers respectively.

Genera
, Plants of the World Online accepted four genera in the family:
Dioscorea Plum. ex L. (including Epipetrum Phil., Rajania L.)
Stenomeris Planch.
Tacca J.R.Forst. & G.Forst.
Trichopus Gaertn.

References

Bibliography

 
 , In

External links
Dioscoreaceae , Taccaceae , Trichopodaceae in L. Watson and M. J. Dallwitz (1992 onwards), The families of flowering plants
Monocot families (USDA)
NCBI Taxonomy Browser
Dioscoreaceae links, Taccaceae links, Trichopodaceae links at CSDL, Texas
Dioscoreaceae Scratchpad in eMonocot 

 
Monocot families